The Taste of Rain... Why Kneel (sometimes stylized as The Taste of Rain...Why Kneel) is the only studio album by Deep Puddle Dynamics, a collaboration between Sole, Doseone, Alias, and Slug. It was released on Anticon in 1999. The title of the album comes from a "western haiku" by Jack Kerouac.

Critical reception
The album received a favorable coverage from URB, Spin, CMJ, and The Wire. It is part of Cokemachineglows Top 60 Albums of the 2000s, appearing in the "Honorable Mentions" section. Michael Endelman of CMJ New Music Monthly said, "these cerebral MCs turn their emotional hang-ups (dejection, alienation, disaffection, etc.) into their calling card." Dave Segal of The Stranger called it "one of underground hiphop's most understatedly adventurous documents, both sonically and lyrically".

A 2006 review for Sputnikmusic called it "the best hip-hop album of all time, and unfortunately one that will never make it very far out of the underground."

Track listing

Personnel
Credits adapted from liner notes.

 Sole – vocals
 Doseone – vocals
 Alias – vocals, production (11)
 Slug – vocals
 DJ Abilities – production (1, 3, 4)
 Moodswing9 – production (2)
 Jel – production (5, 7, 8, 12)
 Ant – production (6)
 DJ Mayonnaise – production (9, 10)

References

External links
 
 

1999 debut albums
Anticon albums
Deep Puddle Dynamics albums
Albums produced by Alias (musician)
Albums produced by Ant (producer)
Albums produced by Jel (music producer)